Lipstick is a 1976 American rape and revenge thriller film directed by Lamont Johnson and starring Margaux Hemingway, Chris Sarandon, and Anne Bancroft. Mariel Hemingway also has a supporting role as Margaux's onscreen sister. The film follows a fashion model who is raped by her sister's music teacher. Upon his acquittal in court, he rapes her sister, leading her to enact a brutal revenge.

Plot

Christine "Chris" McCormick is a highly paid fashion model whose image serves as the driving force of the ad campaign for a popular brand of lipstick and can be seen in magazines and on billboards all around the world. Gordon Stuart, a part-time composer and full-time music teacher, eagerly accepts Chris's 13-year-old sister Kathy's invitation to come to a secluded beachside photo shoot, so Chris can listen to some of his music. He arrives at her apartment one day to visit her, but is interrupted by a phone call from her lover, Steve Edison.

As Chris talks to Steve, Gordon begins to fume at the thought of Chris's obvious rejection. His hurt soon turns to anger, and he enters her room, assaults her, smears her face with the lipstick she helps promote, and then brutally rapes her. Near the end of the ordeal, Kathy returns home from school, walks in on Chris and Gordon, and flees. Gordon gets up and suggests Kathy join them and "have some fun," but instead cuts Chris free and leaves.

Gordon is arrested, but as Chris learns from Carla Bondi, the prosecutor assigned to handle the case, Gordon's conviction is hardly assured, and she asks her to testify against him. Gordon's attorney argues that the sex was consensual, and that its roughness was the result of Chris's "own twisted desires". He also suggests that even if Gordon acted without her consent, she provoked him by appearing naked in front of him at the photo shoot where they first met, and by the inherent sensuality of the photographs from which she makes her living. Gordon is ultimately acquitted.

Chris leaves her job modeling for the lipstick company and plans to relocate to Colorado with Kathy after her last shoot. Unfortunately, Kathy's school is using the same abandoned building where Chris's shoot is to rehearse a new ballet orchestrated by Gordon. Kathy runs into Gordon and flees when he starts fondling her, but Gordon chases her down and rapes her.

Kathy returns to the photo shoot and tells Chris what happened. Gripped in a murderous frenzy, Chris runs outside to her car and grabs a Remington Slide-Action Rifle she had intended to take to Colorado with her. She spots Gordon driving his car in the parking lot, and shoots at it, causing it to crash. As Gordon climbs out of the wreck, Chris keeps shooting him until the rifle is empty. Later, Carla Bondi speaks to a jury, telling them that their acquittal of Gordon earlier resulted in Chris losing faith in the law. The jury ultimately finds Chris not guilty of murder.

Cast
Margaux Hemingway as Christine "Chris" McCormick
Chris Sarandon as Gordon Stuart
Perry King as Steve Edison
Robin Gammell as Nathan Cartwright
John Bennett Perry as Martin McCormick
Mariel Hemingway as Kathy McCormick
Francesco Scavullo as Francesco
Meg Wylie as Sister Margaret
Inga Swenson as Sister Monica
Lauren Jones as Policewoman
Catherine McLeod as Vogue Lady
Anne Bancroft as Carla Bondi

Reception
Lipstick holds a 20% rating at Rotten Tomatoes based upon 10 reviews. Rotten Tomatoes says the film "is a cheap exploitation film pretending to make a social statement about rape and revenge."

Lipstick was met with negative critical reception upon release, with much of the criticism focused around the film's treatment of rape, which was perceived as purely exploitative. Roger Ebert called it "a nasty little item masquerading as a bold statement on the crime of rape. The statement would seem a little bolder if the movie didn't linger in violent and graphic detail over the rape itself, and then handle the vengeance almost as an afterthought." The New York Times remarked the film's glamorous photography, but said it was "anti-intellectual in the ways that B movies always have been."

Variety reviewed the film with a similar sentiment, declaring: "Lipstick has pretensions of being an intelligent treatment of the tragedy of female rape. But by the time it's over, the film has shown its true colors as just another cynical violence exploitation."

Harlan Ellison, writing in March 1977, said: "Lipstick panders to the basest, vilest, lowest possible common denominators of urban fear and lynch logic. It is the sort of film that, if you see it in a ghetto theater filled with blacks, will scare the bejeezus out of you. The animal fury this film unleashes in an audience is terrifying to behold. It gives exploitation a bad name; and it has less to do with rape, which is the commercial hook on which they’ve hung the salability of this bit of putrescence, than it does with the cynicism of Joseph E. Levine, a man who probably has no trouble sleeping with a troubled conscience."

Soundtrack

The soundtrack of the film was by French singer Michel Polnareff who released the album in 1976 on Atlantic Records. The soundtrack became a disco success on its own in the United States and internationally.

Remake
The film inspired an Indian remake in Hindi, titled Insaaf Ka Tarazu (1980) and was remade in Turkish as İffet and Arzu.

References

External links
 
 
 

1976 films
1976 drama films
1970s American films
1970s English-language films
1970s thriller drama films
American rape and revenge films
American thriller drama films
Films directed by Lamont Johnson
Films shot in Los Angeles
Paramount Pictures films